Stephen Douglas Johnson (1963–2003), also known as Steve Johnson, was a Washington, D.C. banking lawyer; a chief lobbyist for the banking and insurance industries; U.S. House Chief Counsel for Financial Institutions and Consumer Credit from February 1995 to November 1997, the heyday of the Gingrich Revolution; and Bush Administration Senior Advisor to the Office of Federal Housing Enterprise Oversight (OFHEO)  where among his varied duties he assisted the director Armando Falcon in the investigation of financial misconduct at Fannie Mae  and  Freddie Mac.  Falcon was forced to resign in February 2003 by President George W. Bush for releasing critical oversight reports stemming from the investigation. The investigation and reports were harbingers of the worldwide financial crisis which was to occur.  The forced resignation of Falcon led Johnson to resign immediately even though Bush eased up and allowed Falcon to finish his term.

Career
Johnson was Chief Counsel of the United States House Financial Services Subcommittee on Financial Institutions and Consumer Credit   from late January 1995 through November 1997 which were the years of Newt Gingrich's reforms.  Rather than being ideological, Johnson was a pragmatic liberal Republican who endeavored to advance reform and modernization of the financial services sector; to seek fair tax and other benefits for all Americans; and to clarify for the common good privacy, credit, and other issues relevant to the banking, insurance, and securities industries.  He also negotiated with the Federal Reserve Board, the Treasury Department, and other federal agencies on all jurisdictional matters.  He often got Alan Greenspan and John D. Hawke, Jr. then undersecretary of the U.S. Treasury to testify at U.S. House hearings which were shaped by him.  While he served as Chief Counsel under Chairperson Marge Roukema, he also had to strike a balance between the diverse personalities composing the subcommittee membership that included Bill McCollum, Toby Roth, Sonny Bono, Ron Paul, Gerald C. Weller, Peter T. King, and Doug Bereuter of the majority to Joseph Kennedy II, Charles E. Schumer, Bruce Vento, Kweisi Mfume, John J. LaFalce, Carolyn B. Maloney, Ken Bentsen, and Cynthia A. McKinney to achieve outcomes with which they all could live.  He also worked with and for the full banking committee's chairman, Jim Leach.  Additionally, he also had been counsel to the United States House Subcommittee on Domestic and International Policy.
As part of his duties, Johnson had to meet with banking and insurance industries representatives and others who were affected by them. He would, therefore, see a wide array of people with different and divergent interests whether it was Hugh McColl of Bank of America or a James Robinson of American Express, or a former congressman like John B. Anderson about a very localized banking matter or the leadership of ACORN.  Often he would have to share the speaker's dais with these same individuals at events such as the ABA conventions, Princeton University's Woodrow Wilson School of Public Affairs forums, etc.  Overall, Johnson was "…by all accounts well-liked and respected. Both banking and insurance representatives lauded his talent and abilities with both the Council of Insurance Agents & Brokers and the Bankers Roundtable not shy about praising him".
After his  United States House of Representatives experience,  Johnson helped raise the profile of the National Association of Insurance Commissioners in his brief tenure and, thereafter, worked as Assistant Vice President of the American Insurance Association to August 1999, for whom he also advocated the interests of the insurance industry before the European Union and  World Trade Organization (WTO). He then moved on to become Vice President and Senior Counsel of the Columbus Group/Columbia Capitol Corporation whose managing directors included Mark Warner, now the junior U. S. senator from Virginia.  When the Bush Administration took office in January 2001, Johnson became Senior Advisor to the Office of Federal Housing Enterprise Oversight where he addressed legislative and regulatory issues involving Fannie Mae and Freddie Mac plus assisting the director, Armando Falcon, on all other agency matters.  Falcon's and Johnson's investigations of these two government chartered agencies led to criticisms of the two which became a foreshadowing of what would evolve and become the worldwide financial crisis.  Falcon was forced to resign by President George W. Bush on February 4, 2003 and Johnson quit immediately thereafter.  Shortly, he left for New York City to pursue work in international consulting.
Prior to serving on the Hill as Chief Counsel, Johnson began his career as an associate with "Muldoon, Murphy and Faucette", a Washington, D.C. based law firm whose specialty was S & L conversions in the late 1980s and 1990s.  From Muldoon et al., Johnson went on to become Regulatory Counsel for ISD/Shaw, now Federal Analytics, Inc, which was headed by Karen Shaw for whom he contributed to the three-volume Combating Credit Discrimination published by the Chicago based American Bankers Institute.

Early life, education, and death
Johnson was raised in Flossmoor, Illinois.  He graduated cum laude from Tulane University of Louisiana in 1985. Beforehand, he had attended Germany's University of Hamburg. He received his J.D. from Tulane Law School in 1988 and his L.L.M. in Banking Law from Boston University's School of Law in 1989.
Johnson died on September 18, 2003 at George Washington University Hospital in Washington, D.C. from complications from a fall he had during the Northeast Blackout of 2003 (August 14, 2003) and from other health problems arising from a business trip immediately thereafter to the Orient.  At the time of his death, Johnson was in Washington, D.C., on business.  Interment occurred in the Flossmoor area subsequently because Johnson wished to be buried near his maternal grandfather, Jan Crull, a scion of old Dutch Protestant Patrician family and a man who had achieved success before World War II and never repeated it thereafter.  Johnson adored his grandfather for the man taught him that one should take life as it is; do the best one can with it; and never look back, not even in anger.

See also
Jan Crull, Jr.
James B. Lockhart III

References

External links
Office of Federal Housing Enterprise Oversight website

1963 births
2003 deaths
20th-century American lawyers
American lobbyists
Boston University School of Law alumni
George W. Bush administration personnel
People from Flossmoor, Illinois
Tulane University alumni
United States Department of Housing and Urban Development officials
United States House of Representatives lawyers
Lawyers from Washington, D.C.